David O. Morgan (1945–2019) was a British historian who was professor emeritus of history at the University of Wisconsin–Madison.  His book The Mongols is considered a standard in the field. Originally published in 1986, a new expanded edition was published in 2007.

Morgan wrote several books on Medieval history, particularly the subject of the Mongol Empire. His previous functions involved being a reader in the history of the Middle East at the School of Oriental and African Studies, London. He held a BA from the University of Oxford and an MA and PhD from the University of London.

Bibliography
 The Mongols, Blackwell Publishing, 2007, 
 Medieval Persia, 1040-1797, second edition published 2016 by Routledge.

Notes

References
 University biography
 Academic review of The Mongols

American medievalists
Alumni of the University of Oxford
Alumni of the University of London
University of Wisconsin–Madison faculty
1945 births
2019 deaths